Chanchal is a town in Malda, West Bengal, India.

Chanchal may also refer to:

Places
Chanchal College, a college in Malda, West Bengal, India
Chanchal (Vidhan Sabha constituency), an assembly constituency in Malda, West Bengal, India
Chanchal subdivision, Malda, West Bengal, India
Chanchal I (community development block), an administrative division in Malda, West Bengal, India

People
Chanchal Chowdhury, Bangladeshi actor
Narendra Chanchal, an Indian playback singer